Mikhail Mitrofanovich Zaitsev (23 November 1923 – 22 January 2009) was a general of the Soviet Army. Zaitsev's principal commands were the Group of Soviet Forces in Germany and the southern military districts of the Soviet Union.

Second World War
Zaitsev was born in 1923 and attended middle school before volunteering for the Soviet Army in 1941. In May 1942, Zaitsev was transferred to the combat arms and served as a staff officer in the 113th Tank Brigade and later the 7th Guards Tank Corps. He was transferred to the headquarters of the 6th Guards Tank Corps.  Zaitsev took part in the battles of Kursk and Berlin, as well as major Soviet operations such as Lvov-Sandomierz, Vistula-Oder, and the drive on Prague. Zaitsev ended his wartime service assigned to the 1st Ukrainian Front.

Postwar

Following the war, Zaitsev served in a variety of staff assignments that built upon his expertise with armored forces and warfare. He commanded a tank division in 1965 and the 5th Guards Tank Army in 1969. He held command of 5th Guards Tank Army from 2.12.69 to 11.8.72. In May 1976, he became commander of the Belorussian Military District. In 1980, he has transferred to the German Democratic Republic (East Germany) and became commander of the Group of Soviet Forces in Germany (GSFG) on 22 October 1980, a position he held until 6 July 1985. Zaitsev was made a Hero of the Soviet Union on 22 November 1983. Zaitsev's priorities for GSFG included training that stressed the use of individual initiative by junior officers.

During his tour of command of GSFG, a crisis with the United States broke out because of the shooting of Arthur D. Nicholson, a U.S. officer assigned to the U.S. Military Liaison Mission in East Germany. Zaitsev subsequently had a tense meeting with General Glenn K. Otis, the commander of U.S. Army Europe, in which Zaitsev stated the Soviet forces had not acted improperly when Nicholson was shot.

From 1985 until 1989, Zaitsev commanded the Southern Strategic Direction (three southern military districts of the Soviet Union, including the Turkestan Military District, see Formations of the Soviet Army) and thus supervised the Limited Contingent of Soviet Forces in Afghanistan (:ru:Ограниченный контингент советских войск в Афганистане), mostly made up of troops of the 40th Army and the Air Force's 34th Composite Aviation Corps, plus Border and KGB Troops. From 1989 until his retirement in 1992, Zaitsev was assigned to the inspector-general staff of the Soviet Ministry of Defense.

In 1981, he was a member of the Central Committee of the Communist Party, and from 1979 until 1989 he was a member of the Supreme Soviet.

In retirement, he lived in Moscow until his death. General Mikhail Zaitsev is interred in Troyekurovskoye Cemetery.

References

 Cooley, John K., Unholy Wars, London: Pluto Press, 2002. .

1923 births
2009 deaths
Bolsheviks
Central Committee of the Communist Party of the Soviet Union members
Russian people of World War II
Soviet military personnel of World War II
Army generals (Soviet Union)
Heroes of the Soviet Union
Recipients of the Order of the Red Banner
Recipients of the Order of Lenin
Recipients of the Medal "For Courage" (Russia)
Recipients of the Scharnhorst Order
People from Chernsky District
Burials in Troyekurovskoye Cemetery
Military Academy of the General Staff of the Armed Forces of the Soviet Union alumni